The City of Mandaluyong Science High School (Filipino: Mataas na Paaralang Pang-Agham ng Lungsod ng Mandaluyong) is a public science high school at E. Pantaleon St., Hulo, Mandaluyong, Philippines.

History 

The City of Mandaluyong Science High School (CMSHS) was the brainchild of Hon. Neptali “Boyet” M. Gonzales II, Representative, Lone District of the City of Mandaluyong. It was borne out of the need to give quality public secondary education that will nurture the best students of the city. His dream transformed into reality during the groundbreaking ceremonies on March 15, 1996 at the Jolo, now Hulo, Elementary School compound, E. Pantaleon Street. The school was founded through the collaborative efforts of Rep. Neptali “Boyet” M. Gonzales II, Senate President Neptali A. Gonzales Sr., then City Mayor Benjamin S. Abalos Sr., the City Council of Mandaluyong, Dr. Pedro A. Ramos, former schools division superintendent and Dr. Eden C. Diaz, then assistant schools division superintendent, and Dr. Emelita D. Magsalin, education supervisor in science and health who was appointed officer-in-charge (OIC).

13 pioneering teachers were selected to start classes in June 1996 using the Special Science and Technology curriculum, to an enrolment of 144 students who passed the written and oral examination conducted by the education supervisors of the City Schools of Mandaluyong. The old six-room Grade VI Building of Hulo Elementary School served as the first classrooms, administrative office/faculty room, and canteen.

The left wing of the CMSHS building was constructed in 1996. By June 1997, the students occupied the new classrooms. Before end of December 1997, the right wing was completed and in 1998, the whole building was completed; computers, tables, and chairs were delivered.

On February 12, 1998, President Fidel V. Ramos signed into law, House Bill 7492 authored by Rep. Neptali "Boyet" Gonzales II, thus Republic Act No. 8497 was born enacting that a science high school be established at Barangay Hulo, City of Mandaluyong and appropriating funds.

The completion of the water reservoir and toilet facilities ensued, followed by the façade, basketball court, and landscaping. With the arrival of the new sets of computers and construction of the Speech Laboratory sponsored by Eduardo Cojuangco Jr., the unveiling of the CMSHS marker took place on August 30, 1999 with Joseph Estrada, the then-President of the Republic of the Philippines, as the Guest of Honor.

CMSHS had its first batch of graduates in 2000 led by first valedictorian Amadea Paula Unisa. It serves graduates of public and private grade schools in Mandaluyong and nearby cities such as San Juan, Pasig and Makati.

Sections of classes were named after Filipino (second and fourth years) and foreign scientists (first and third years). In 2009, sections of classes were named after elements in the periodic table. Recently, sections are named after constellations, scientists, units of measurement, and molecular and atomic parts.

References

Mandaluyong
Mandaluyong
Schools in Mandaluyong